State Highway 61 (SH 61) is a State Highway in Kerala, India that starts in Potta and ends in Moonupeedika. This highway is 21 km long. It connects National Highway 66 to National Highway 544 which are two main national highways in Kerala. Irinjalakuda town is situated on this road which is the headquarters of Irinjalakuda Revenue Division and  Mukundapuram Taluk. Irinjalakuda railway station is also located along this road

Route 
Potta –  Aloor - Kallettumkara- Vallakkunnu-Pullur- Irinjalakuda – Edathirinji - Moonupeedika

See also 
Roads in Kerala
List of State Highways in Kerala

References 

State Highways in Kerala
Roads in Thrissur district